Barrus is a monotypic genus of karschiid camel spiders, first described by Eugène Simon in 1880. Its single species, Barrus letourneuxi is distributed in Egypt.

References 

Solifugae
Arachnid genera
Monotypic arachnid genera